This article contains a list of fossil-bearing stratigraphic units in the state of New Jersey, U.S.

Sites

See also

 Paleontology in New Jersey

References

 

New Jersey
Stratigraphic units
Stratigraphy of New Jersey
New Jersey geography-related lists
United States geology-related lists